Reddick may refer to:

Reddick, Florida, United States
Reddick, Illinois, United States
Reddick Nunatak, Antarctica
Reddick (surname)